ICGS Sachet is the Indian Coast Guard's latest and largest offshore patrol vessel (OPV). Sachet is seventh ship in the  OPV and the first ship from the second batch ordered by Indian Coast Guard and has been built by Goa Shipyard Limited. The vessel was commissioned to coast guard service on 15 May 2020 by Defence Minister Rajnath Singh. The commissioning is special as this was the first ever digital commissioning of any Indian Coast Guard's ship due to global pandemic COVID-19. Sachet will be extensively used for Exclusive Economic Zone and other duties as it is set to be exploited extensively. The vessel will be under the command of Deputy Inspector General Rajesh Mittal.

The vessel was laid down on 20 March 2017 and was subsequently launched on 21 February 2019. Goa Shipyard delivered the ship to Indian Coast Guard on 24 February 2020. With the  commissioning of Sachet and other two interceptor craft, Indian Coast Guard became a force having 150 ships and boats with various other ship is construction.

Gallery

See also

References

Ships of the Indian Coast Guard
2019 ships